Emerson Electric Co. is an American multinational corporation headquartered in Ferguson, Missouri. The Fortune 500 company manufactures products and provides engineering services for industrial, commercial, and consumer markets.
Emerson has approximately 86,700 employees and 170 manufacturing locations.

History
Emerson was established in 1890 in St. Louis, Missouri, as Emerson Electric Manufacturing Co. by Civil War Union veteran John Wesley Emerson to manufacture electric motors using a patent owned by the Scottish-born brothers Charles and Alexander Meston. In 1892, it became the first to sell electric fans in the United States. It quickly expanded its product line to include electric sewing machines, electric dental drills, and power tools.

During World War II, under the leadership of Stuart Symington, Emerson became the world's largest manufacturer of airplane armament. Emerson ranked 52nd among United States corporations in the value of World War II military production contracts. 

In 1954, W.R. "Buck" Persons was named company president. Under his leadership, Emerson diversified its business by acquiring 36 companies. When he retired in 1973, the company had 82 plants, 31,000 employees and $800 million in sales.

In 1962, acquired United States Electrical Manufacturing Company as the U.S. Electrical Motors Division, including the brand U.S. Motors. In 1968, it acquired the InSinkErator company.

Charles F. Knight served as CEO from 1973 to 2000, and was chairman from 1974 to 2004. His tenure was marked by the development of a rigorous planning process, new product and technology development, acquisitions and joint ventures, and international growth. David Farr succeeded him as chairman, who was also the CEO until 2021.

On December 15, 1999, Emerson Electric agreed to acquire Jordan Industries Inc.'s telecommunications equipment business for $440 million.

In 2010, the U.S. Motors brand was sold to Nidec Motor Corporation.

On July 26, 2011, Emerson announced it would locate its Latin America headquarters in Sunrise, Florida.

On December 1, 2016, Platinum Equity acquired the Emerson Network Power business for over $4 billion and rebranded it Vertiv. The acquisition included the brands ASCO, Chloride, Liebert, NetSure, and Trellis.

In July 2018, Emerson completed the purchase of Textron Tools and Test Businesses for $810 million (Including Greenlee, Klauke, HD Electric, and Sherman + Reilly).

On April 1, 2020, Emerson acquired American Governor Company to boost its presence in the hydropower controls systems market.

In October 2022, Emerson agreed to sell a 55 percent majority stake in its climate technologies business to private equity firm Blackstone Inc. in a $14billion deal including debt.

Products

Emerson Electric produce's avionics here is a list of some of their products
 AN/APG-69
 AN/APQ-157
 AN/APQ-159

Corporate 
The company's leaders since the mid-20th century have been, respectively, W. R. Persons (19541973; President), Charles Knight (19732000, CEO), and David Farr (20002021, CEO). The company's chair of the board have been Charles Knight (19742004) and David Farr (2004 to 2021). Jim Turley is the current Chair of the Board.

Emerson is structured into two business units: automation; and commercial and residential.

Environmental records
In 2008 (using data from 2005), researchers at the University of Massachusetts Amherst identified Emerson as the 97th largest corporate producer of air pollution in the United States, down from its previous rank of 56th. Major pollutants indicated by the study include nickel compounds, manganese, diisocyanate, and lead.

Corporate relationships

Emerson's brands acquisitions

On December 22, 2014, Emerson announced the acquisition of Scotland-based Cascade Technologies Ltd., expanding their gas-analysis portfolio with laser-based measurement analyzers and systems for enhanced industrial emissions monitoring, production efficiencies and regulatory compliance. Other main Emerson acquisitions and brands include:

 Advanced Protection Technologies
 AMS Suite
 American Governor Company
 Aperture
 APM Automation Solutions
 Alco Controls
 Appleton Group (formerly EGS Electrical Group)
 Artesyn (spun off on Jan 2014)
 ASCO International (sold to Schneider Electric in 2017)
 ASCO Numatics 
 Astec (spun off on Jan 2014)
 Aventics
 Avocent
 Avtron Loadbank
 Bettis
 Branson
 Bristol Babcock
 Cascade Technologies Ltd
 Chloride Group
 Chromalox (sold to JPMorgan Partners in 2003)
 Closet Maid (sold to Griffon Corp in late 2017)
 Control Products
 Control Techniques (sold to Nidec in early 2017)
 Cooper-Atkins
 Copeland
 CSI Technologies
 DeltaV
 Dixell
 Electronic Navigation Industries
 Enardo LLC
 Energy Systems
 Firetrol
 Fisher Regulators
 Fisher Valves & Instruments
 Fusite
 GeoFields
Greenlee Tools
 Groveley Detection Ltd
 InSinkErator
 Intelligent Store
 Islatrol
 Knurr (a business of Vertiv now)
 Leroy-Somer (sold to Nidec in early 2017)
 Liebert (a business of Vertiv now)
 METCO
 Metro (InterMetro Industries)
 Micro Motion
 Mimic
 Mobrey
 Open Systems International (pending sale late 2020)
 Ovation
 Paine Electronics
 Paradigm
 Pentair Valves & Controls
 Permasense
 Plantweb Optics
 Power Transmission Solutions 
 Progea Group
 ProSys, Inc.
 ProTeam
 Pryne & Co., Inc.
 Ridgid (Ridge Tool Company)
 Rosemount
 Rosemount Analytical
 Roxar
 Saab Marine Electronics
 Sensi
 Spence and Nicholson
 SSB Wind Systems (sold to Nidec in early 2017)
 Surge Protection
 Syncade
 TopWorx
 Tescom
 Therm-O-Disc
 Verdant
 Vilter
 White-Rodgers
 WORKSHOP
 Zedi

NBC Heroes lawsuit 
On October 2, 2006, Emerson filed suit in federal court against NBC regarding a scene that appeared in the pilot episode of the network's TV series Heroes. The scene depicted Claire Bennet reaching into an active garbage disposal, severely injuring her hand. Emerson's suit claims the scene "casts the disposer in an unsavory light, irreparably tarnishing the product" by suggesting that serious injuries will result "in the event consumers were to accidentally insert their hand into one."

Emerson asked for a ruling barring future broadcasts of the pilot and to block NBC from using any Emerson trademarks in the future.

On February 23, 2007, the case was dropped. NBC Universal and Emerson Electric settled the lawsuit outside of court.

References

External links

Emerson Electric Company website
Liebert Corporation - Divisional website
Asco Power Technologies - Divisional website
Emerson Climate Technologies - Divisional Website
 Digital Scroll Compressors

1890 establishments in Missouri
American companies established in 1890
Companies based in St. Louis County, Missouri
Companies listed on the New York Stock Exchange
Electric motor manufacturers
Electrical engineering companies of the United States
Electronics companies established in 1890
Electronics companies of the United States
Manufacturing companies based in Missouri
Multinational companies headquartered in the United States
Power tool manufacturers
Tool manufacturing companies of the United States